Sivayoginathar Temple also known as Yoganandeswarar temple  is a Hindu temple dedicated to Shiva located in is located in Thiruvisanallur in Thanjavur district, Tamil Nadu, India. Shiva is worshiped as Sivayoginathar, and is represented by the lingam and his consort Parvati is depicted as Mangala Nayagi. The presiding deity is revered in the 7th century Tamil Saiva canonical work, the Tevaram, written by Tamil poet saints known as the nayanars and classified as Paadal Petra Sthalam.

There are many inscriptions associated with the temple indicating contributions from Cholas, Thanjavur Nayaks and Thanjavur Maratha kingdom. The oldest parts of the present masonry structure were built during the Chola dynasty in the 9th century, while later expansions, are attributed to later periods, up to the Thanjavur Nayaks during the 16th century.

The temple house a five-tiered gateway tower known as gopurams. The temple has numerous shrines, with those of Sivayoginathar and Soundaranayagi being the most prominent. The temple complex houses many halls and three precincts. The temple has six daily rituals at various times from 6:30 a.m. to 9 p.m., and five yearly festivals on its calendar. The Aippasi Brahmostavam festival when the sacred marriage of the presiding deity is performed, is the major festival in the temple. The temple is now maintained and administered by Hindu Religious and Charitable Endowments Department of the Government of Tamil Nadu.

Legend

As per Hindu legend, a king belonging to present day Kerala had illicit relation with lot of women. He also tortured and cheated many of them. At one stage, the king wanted to restore to a decent life and found a yogi who advised him to visit Thiruvisanallur. The king reached the place, had a dip in river Cauvery and worshipped Sivayoginathar to get rid of his curse. The legend leads to the belief that whoever incurs curse of women, gets curative visiting the temple. As per another legend, Nandi (the sacred bull of Shiva) got rid of Yama (Hindu god of death), who was approaching a worshipper of Shiva. This legend leads to the belief that a visit to the place is a curative to death related fears.

As per popular legend, a devotee who served in the temple of Tirumankalakkuti died there. He was brought back to life by the divine grace of Soundaranayagi. Brahma, who was born as the son of Vishnusarma, performed penance at this place along with his seven brothers and merged with the deity.

Architecture

Thiruvisanallur can be traced to the time of the Medieval Cholas having 97 inscriptions dating back to Parantaka I, Rajaraja Chola I and Rajendra Chola II. In modern times, the temple is now maintained and administered by Hindu Religious and Charitable Endowments Department of the Government of Tamil Nadu.

The Sivayoginathar Temple is believed to be built at the spot where eight Siva yogis attained salvation and merged with the lingam. The shrine is dedicated to Chatur Kala Bhairava, one of the four Bhairavas. The temple has a 5 tier rajagopuram with a large temple complex.  The temple was erected during the Parantaka I reign 907-955 A.D.  The sanctum is akin to Vaprabandha type with Arthapadma, a feature not mentioned in Vastu Shastra texts.  The beautiful large vyalas in the prathimukha are among the most powerfully conceived of their kind.  It is of modest proportions and consists of the sanctuary and its attached mandapam(hall).  The two cover a total length of 15.3m, with its vimana measuring about 15.3m.  The mandapam is a hall of 4 central pillars, and a vestibule provided at its back, leading to the sanctum, which is a square chamber of 3.7m.  The lion motif is absent in the pillars though it reappeared in friezes where ever suited.  The pillars in the interior are typical of Chola art.  The usual deities are enshrined in the central niches outside the wall of the sanctum.  The toranas over the south and west niches are of good workmanship, especially that on the west, which is perhaps the finest in South India

Religious importance and worship practices 

The temple is revered in the verses of Tevaram, the 7th century Saivite canonical work by the three saint poets, namely, Appar, Sambandar and Sundarar. As the temple is revered in Tevaram, it is classified as Paadal Petra Sthalam, one of the 275 temples that find mention in the Saiva canon. The temple is counted as one of the temples built on the northern banks of River Kaveri. 

The temple priests perform the puja (rituals) during festivals and on a daily basis. Like other Shiva temples of Tamil Nadu, the priests belong to the Shaiva community, a Brahmin sub-caste. The temple rituals are performed six times a day; Ushathkalam at 6:30 a.m., Kalasanthi at 8:00 a.m., Uchikalam at 12:00 a.m., Sayarakshai at 5:00 p.m., and Ardha Jamam at 8:00 p.m. Each ritual comprises four steps: abhisheka (sacred bath), alangaram (decoration), naivethanam (food offering) and deepa aradanai (waving of lamps) for both Sivayoginathar and Soundaranayagi. The worship is held amidst music with nagaswaram (pipe instrument) and tavil (percussion instrument), religious instructions in the Vedas (sacred texts) read by priests and prostration by worshipers in front of the temple mast.
The Aipassi Brahmotsavam festival is the major festival in the temple when there is Panchamurthi procession. The Chittirai festival is celebrated for three days when Sunlight falls directly on the presiding deity.

Palace Devasthanam
Thanjavur Palace Devasthanam comprises 88 temples, of which this temple is the one. They are maintained and administered by the Hindu Religious and Charitable Endowments Department of the Government of Tamil Nadu.

References

External links
  

Padal Petra Stalam
Shiva temples in Thanjavur district